The 1844 Chicago mayoral elections is the first of only two instances in which a Chicago mayoral election was declared invalid (the other being the disputed April 1876 mayoral election).

As a result of the Common Council declaring the result of the city's March 1844 mayoral election null and void, a second election was held in April.

While the result of the March election had been a victory for incumbent mayor Augustus Garrett, Garrett was defeated in the April election by Alson Sherman, who had not been a candidate in March.

March election

In the Chicago mayoral election of March 1844, Democrat Augustus Garrett was reelected, defeating Whig nominee George W. Dole by a margin of only seven votes out of 1,796 votes cast.

Campaign
In February incumbent mayor Augustus Garrett was unanimously nominated by the Democratic Party to run for reelection. George W. Dole was the Whig Party nominee. Also running was abolitionist Henry Smith, making this the third consecutive Chicago mayoral election he competed in.

Results

Had the results of this election not been overturned, Garrett would have become the first individual to be elected to two consecutive terms as mayor of Chicago. This accolade instead went to James H. Woodworth in 1849.

Voiding of the March election
The Common Council investigated allegations that the Democrats had conducted electoral fraud in the mayoral election. Whigs alleged that the Democrats had bought votes, violated the secrecy of ballots in two wards (the 3rd and 5th), and altering the clocks at election places.  The Common Council assembled an investigating committee which heard more than two weeks of testimony from more than thirty witnesses. While the committee ignored many allegations, the Common Council, nevertheless, ordered for a new election to be conducted on the grounds that clerks in wards had been unqualified to vote.

April election

In the Chicago mayoral election of April 1844, Independent Democrat Alson Sherman defeated Democratic incumbent Augustus Garrett and Liberty Party nominee Henry Smith by a 9 point margin.

Results

References

1844
Chicago
Chicago
1840s in Chicago